Cavanaugh Bay Airport  is a public use airport located three nautical miles (6 km) north of the central business district of Coolin, 
in Bonner County, Idaho, United States.  It is owned by the State of Idaho, Idaho Transportation Department, Division of Aeronautics. The airport is located on the east side of Priest Lake, at the south end of Cavanaugh Bay.

Facilities and aircraft 
It has one runway designated 15/33 with a 3,100 x 120 ft (945 x 37 m) turf surface. For the 12-month period ending June 7, 2006, the airport had 4,500 general aviation aircraft operations, an average of 375 per month.

See also 
 Priest Lake USFS Airport
 Tanglefoot Seaplane Base

References

External links 
Cavanaugh Bay Airport (66S) at Idaho Transportation Department

Airports in Idaho
Buildings and structures in Bonner County, Idaho
Transportation in Bonner County, Idaho